Robert Owen (1771–1858) was a Welsh social philosopher and reformer; one of the founders of socialism and the cooperative movement.

Robert or Rob Owen may also refer to:

 Robert Owen (Australian politician) (1799–1878), Politician and judge from New South Wales, Australia
 Robert Dale Owen (1801–1877), Welsh-Scottish-American social reformer and U. S. Representative from Indiana
 Robert Owen (theologian) (1820–1902), Welsh theologian and antiquarian
 Robert Latham Owen (1856–1947), American politician; represented Oklahoma in U. S. Senate
 Robert Owen (artist) (born 1937), Australian artist
 Sir Robert Owen (judge) (born 1944), British judge
 Robert Owen (canoeist) (born c. 1955), British slalom canoer
 Rob Owen (journalist) (born 1971), American newspaperman
 Robert Owen (darts player) (born 1984), Welsh dart player
 Robert L. Owen Sr. (1825–1873), surveyor and civil engineer, railroad executive, politician and Virginia plantation owner

Fictional
 Rob Owen (Hollyoaks), a character on the British soap opera Hollyoaks

See also
 Robert Owens (disambiguation)